Han Seok-bong was a leading mid-Joseon period calligrapher.  He composed calligraphy for the royal court of Korea. original name was Han Ho. Chinise name was Kyunghong(경홍;景洪), pen name was Seok-bong(석봉;石峯), Chongsa(청사;淸沙).

Born in Songdo in the early sixteenth century, in the reign of King Jungjong, Han became a master calligrapher and the primary transcriber for the next king of Joseon, Seonjo. During his lifetime, his fame for calligrapher spread through all the land and even to China. One of his famous works is the Dosan-Seowon.

History 
Han-ho was born in Kaesong in 1543. His father is Han Eon-Gong, and his grandfather is Byeong Jo and Han Se-gwan. At the age of 3, he learned to write with his father and his grandfather, but at the age of 15 he continued to teach with his grandfather. Since then, the living of his family has been very poor. At the age of 12, he entered the clan of Young-gye Shinhoe-nam.

In 1567 (22 of King Myeongjong), he passed Jinsha City at the age of 25. After that, in 1583 (Seonjo 16), he served as an inspector at the Saheon Department. In 1592, during the Imjin War, he went to King Saboro's hagwon (行在所) in charge of documentary affairs, and served as the head of Gapyeong-gun and Gap-gok.

As a Sajagwan (writing documents right away), Han Ho spent time writing major national and diplomatic documents, and during that time he followed the envoy to the Ming Dynasty several times. Whenever he followed the envoy to the Ming Dynasty, Han Ho was praised as the best in the East for writing with a unique and elaborate handwriting at the curb opening, and he was often compared with Wang Hee-ji by several high-ranking officials in the Ming Dynasty.

Seonjo always hung Hanho's writings on the wall to appreciate, and it is said that during the Imjin War and Jeong Yujae, admirals of the Ming Dynasty, Lee Yeo-song (李如松) and the devil (麻貴), who had come to help Joseon, also asked Han-ho to handwritten it.

He died in 1605.

References

Year of birth unknown
Year of death unknown
Joseon writers
16th-century Korean calligraphers
17th-century Korean calligraphers
Interpreters
People from Kaesong